Steven Allan Spielberg  (born December 18, 1946) is an American film director, writer and producer. A major figure of the New Hollywood era and pioneer of the modern blockbuster, he is the most commercially successful director of all time. He is the recipient of various accolades, including three Academy Awards, two BAFTA Awards, and four Directors Guild of America Awards, as well as the AFI Life Achievement Award in 1995, the Kennedy Center Honor in 2006, the Cecil B. DeMille Award in 2009 and the Presidential Medal of Freedom in 2015. Seven of his films have been inducted into the National Film Registry by the Library of Congress as "culturally, historically or aesthetically significant".

Spielberg was born in Cincinnati, Ohio, and grew up in Phoenix, Arizona. He moved to California and studied film in college. After directing several episodes for television including Night Gallery and Columbo, he directed the television film Duel (1971) which later received in international theatrical release. He made his theatrical film debut with The Sugarland Express (1974), and became a household name with the 1975 summer blockbuster Jaws. He then directed huge box office successes Close Encounters of the Third Kind (1977), E.T. the Extra-Terrestrial (1982) and the Indiana Jones original trilogy (1981–89). All these films were among the top ten highest grossing films of the 1970's and 1980's, with Jaws and E.T. the Extra-Terrestrial the highest-grossing film ever at the time. He subsequently explored drama in the The Color Purple (1985) and Empire of the Sun (1987).

In 1993, Spielberg directed back-to-back box office hits with the science fiction thriller Jurassic Park, the highest-grossing film ever at the time, and the Holocaust drama Schindler's List, which has often been listed as one of the greatest films ever made. He won the Academy Award for Best Director for the latter and for the 1998 World War II epic Saving Private Ryan. Spielberg continued in the 2000s with science fiction films A.I. Artificial Intelligence (2001), Minority Report (2002) and War of the Worlds (2005). He also directed the adventure films The Adventures of Tintin (2011) and Ready Player One (2018); the historical dramas Amistad (1997), Munich (2005), War Horse (2011), Lincoln (2012), Bridge of Spies (2015) and The Post (2017); the musical West Side Story (2021); and the semi-autobiographical drama The Fabelmans (2022).

Spielberg co-founded Amblin Entertainment and DreamWorks, and has served as a producer for many successful films and television series. He is also known for his long collaboration with the composer John Williams, with whom he has worked for all but five of his feature films. Several of Spielberg's works are considered among the greatest films of all time, and are among the highest-grossing. Premiere ranked him first place in the list of 100 Most Powerful People in Movies in 2003. In 2013, Time listed him as one of the 100 most influential people.

Early life and background
Steven Allan Spielberg was born on December 18, 1946, in Cincinnati, Ohio. His mother, Leah (née Posner, later Adler; 1920–2017), was a restaurateur and concert pianist, and his father, Arnold Spielberg (1917–2020), was an electrical engineer involved in the development of computers. His immediate family were situationally Reform Jewish/Orthodox Jewish. Spielberg's paternal grandparents were Jews from Ukraine; his grandmother Rebecca, maiden name Chechik, was from Sudylkiv, and his grandfather Shmuel Spielberg was from Kamianets-Podilskyi. Schmuel escaped to Cincinnati in 1906 to avoid being drafted into the Russian army, and brought his fiancée Rebecca there in 1908. Spielberg has three younger sisters: Anne, Sue, and Nancy. In 1952, his family moved to Haddon Township, New Jersey after his father was hired by RCA. Spielberg attended Hebrew school from 1953 to 1957, in classes taught by Rabbi Albert L. Lewis.

In early 1957, the family moved to Phoenix, Arizona. Spielberg had a bar mitzvah ceremony when he was thirteen. His family was involved in the synagogue and had many Jewish friends. Of the Holocaust, he said that his parents "talked about it all the time, and so it was always on my mind." His father had lost between sixteen and twenty relatives in the Holocaust. Spielberg found it difficult accepting his heritage; he said: "It isn't something I enjoy admitting ... but when I was seven, eight, nine years old, God forgive me, I was embarrassed because we were Orthodox Jews. I was embarrassed by the outward perception of my parents' Jewish practices. I was never really ashamed to be Jewish, but I was uneasy at times." Spielberg also suffered from anti-Semitism: "In high school, I got smacked and kicked around. Two bloody noses. It was horrible." He grew away from Judaism during adolescence, after his family had moved to various neighborhoods and found themselves to be the only Jews.

Spielberg's interest in film started at a young age. At age 12, he made his first home movie: a train wreck involving his toy Lionel trains. In 1958, he became a Boy Scout and fulfilled a requirement for the photography merit badge by making a nine-minute, 8 mm film titled The Last Gunfight. He eventually attained the rank of Eagle Scout. Spielberg used his father's movie camera to make amateur features, and began taking the camera along on every Scout trip. At age 13, Spielberg made a 40-minute war film, titled Escape to Nowhere, with a cast of school classmates. The film won first prize in a statewide competition. Throughout his early teens, and after entering high school, Spielberg made about fifteen to twenty 8 mm "adventure" films.

In Phoenix, Spielberg watched films at the local theatre every Saturday. Some of the films he cited as early influences include Godzilla, King of the Monsters! (1956), Akira Kurosawa films, Captains Courageous (1937), Pinocchio (1940), and David Lean's Lawrence of Arabia (1962), which he cited as "the film that set me on my journey". He attended Arcadia High School in 1961 for three years. He wrote and directed his first independent film in 1963, a 140-minute science fiction adventure called Firelight, which would later inspire Close Encounters of The Third Kind. The film was mainly funded by his father, which had a budget of under $600, and was shown in a local theatre for one evening. In the summer of 1964, he worked as an unpaid assistant at Universal Studios' editorial department. His family later moved to Saratoga, California where he attended Saratoga High School, graduating in 1965. A year later, his parents divorced. Spielberg moved to Los Angeles to stay with his father, while his three sisters and mother remained in Saratoga. He was not interested in academics; he aspired to be only a filmmaker. He applied to the University of Southern California's film school but was turned down because of his mediocre grades. He then applied and enrolled at California State University, Long Beach, where he became a brother of Theta Chi Fraternity.

After taking a tour bus to Universal Studios, a chance conversation with an executive led to Spielberg getting a three-day pass to the premises, allowing him to come back the next day. On the fourth day he walked up to the studio gates without a pass, and the security guard waved him in: “I basically spent the next two months at Universal Studios. And that was how I became an unofficial apprentice that summer.”

In 1968, Universal gave Spielberg the opportunity to write and direct a short film for theatrical release, the 26-minute, 35 mm Amblin'. Studio vice president Sidney Sheinberg was impressed by the award-winning film, and offered Spielberg a seven-year directing contract. A year later, he dropped out of college to begin directing television productions for Universal. It made him the youngest director to be signed to a long-term plan with a major Hollywood studio. Spielberg returned to Long Beach in 2002 to complete his Bachelor of Arts in Film and Electronic Media.

Career

1969–1974: Entering film and television
Spielberg's first professional job came when he was hired to direct one of the segments for the 1969 pilot episode of Night Gallery, written by Rod Serling and starring Joan Crawford. Crawford was "speechless, and then horrified" at the thought of a young and inexperienced newcomer directing her. Spielberg attempted to impress his colleagues with fancy camerawork, but executives ordered him to shoot it quickly. His contributions were not well received, thus Spielberg took a short break from the studio. However, Crawford said:

In the early 1970s, Spielberg unsuccessfully tried to raise financing for his own low-budget films. He turned to writing screenplays with other writers, and then directing television episodes. These included the series: Marcus Welby, M.D., The Name of the Game ("L.A. 2017"), Columbo, Owen Marshall, Counselor at Law and The Psychiatrist. Although unsatisfied with this work, Spielberg used the opportunity to experiment with his techniques and learn about filmmaking. He earned good reviews and impressed producers; he was earning a steady income and relocated to Laurel Canyon, Los Angeles.

Based on the strength of his work, Universal signed Spielberg to do four television films. The first was Duel (1971), adapted from Richard Matheson's short story of the same name. It is about a psychotic tanker truck driver who chases a terrified salesman (Dennis Weaver) down a highway. Impressed with the film, executives decided to promote the film on television. Reviews were mainly positive, and Universal asked Spielberg to shoot more scenes so that Duel could be released to international markets. Several films followed soon after: Something Evil (1972), and Savage (1973). Both features gained mixed reviews.

In 1974, Spielberg made his debut in a theatrical film, The Sugarland Express, about a married couple on the run, desperate to regain custody of their baby from foster parents. Based on a true story, the film would mark the first of many collaborations with the composer John Williams; Spielberg was impressed with his previous soundtracks. The film opened to four hundred theatres in the U.S. to positive reviews, and The Hollywood Reporter wrote that "a major new director is on the horizon." Although the film was honored for Best Screenplay at the 1974 Cannes Film Festival, it was not a commercial success. Spielberg blamed Universal's inconsistent marketing for its poor box office results.

1975–1980: Film breakthrough 
Producers Richard D. Zanuck and David Brown took a chance with Spielberg, and gave him the opportunity to direct Jaws (1975), a horror-thriller based on the Peter Benchley novel of the same name. In the film, a great white shark attacks beachgoers at a summer resort town, prompting police chief Martin Brody (Roy Scheider) to hunt it down with the help of a marine biologist (Richard Dreyfuss). Filming proved to be challenging; Spielberg almost drowned and escaped from being crushed by boats. The filming schedule overran by a hundred days, and Universal threatened to cancel production. Against expectations, the film was a critical success; Jaws won three Academy Awards, in Best Film Editing, Best Original Dramatic Score, and Best Sound, and grossed more than $470 million worldwide. It also set the domestic box office record, leading to what the press described as "Jawsmania", and making Spielberg a household name. After watching the unconventional, off-center camera techniques of Jaws, Alfred Hitchcock praised "young Spielberg" for thinking outside the visual dynamics of the theater, saying "He's the first one of us who doesn't see the proscenium arch".

After the success of Jaws, Spielberg turned down an offer to make Jaws 2. He and Richard Dreyfuss re-convened to work on a film about UFOs: Close Encounters of the Third Kind (1977). During filming, Spielberg used 65 mm film for the best picture quality, and a new live-action recording system so that the recordings could be duplicated later. One of the rare films both written and directed by himself, Close Encounters was very popular with film-goers, and Spielberg received his first Best Director nomination from the Academy Awards. It also earned six more nominations, winning Best Cinematography, and Best Sound Effects Editing. A Special Edition version of the film, featuring both shortened and newly added scenes, was released theatrically in 1980.

His next film was 1979's big-budget action-comedy 1941, about Californians preparing for a Japanese invasion after the attack on Pearl Harbor. Spielberg was self-conscious about doing comedy as he had no prior experience in the genre. However, he was keen on tackling a lighthearted theme. Universal and Columbia agreed to co-finance the film. Upon release, it grossed over $92.4 million worldwide, but most critics including the studio heads disliked the film. Writing for the Los Angeles Times, Charles Champlin described 1941 as "the most conspicuous waste since the last major oil spill, which it somewhat resembles". Another critic wrote "1941 isn't simply a silly slur against any particular race, sex, or generation—it makes war against all humanity."

1981- 1990: Widespread commercial success and production 

Next, Spielberg collaborated with Star Wars creator George Lucas on an action adventure, Raiders of the Lost Ark (1981), the first film in the Indiana Jones franchise. The title character was played by Harrison Ford (whom Lucas had previously cast in his Star Wars trilogy as Han Solo). Ford was Spielberg's first choice for the role. Filmed in North Africa, the shoot was difficult but Spielberg said that the experience helped him with his business acumen. The film was a success at the box office, and won five Academy Awards; Spielberg received his second nomination for Best Director, and Best Picture. Raiders of the Lost Ark was considered by Spielberg and Lucas as a homage to the serials of the 1930s and 1940s. Spielberg also began to co-produce films, including 1982's Poltergeist, and directed the segment "Kick The Can" in The Twilight Zone. In a previous segment, Vic Morrow and two child actors were killed in a stunt helicopter crash. Spielberg was not directing or present during the incident, and was cleared of any wrongdoing by the National Transportation Safety Board.

In 1982, Spielberg returned to science fiction with E.T. the Extra-Terrestrial. It tells the story of a young boy (Henry Thomas) and the alien he befriends, who was accidentally left behind by his companions and is attempting to return home. Spielberg shot the film mostly in sequence to keep the children spontaneous towards the climax. E.T. premiered at the 1982 Cannes Film Festival to an ecstatic reaction; producer Kathleen Kennedy recalled, "You couldn't hear the end of the movie because people were on their feet stomping and yelling [...] It was one of the most amazing experiences." A special screening was organized for President Reagan and his wife Nancy, who were emotional by the end of the film. E.T. grossed $700 million worldwide, and spawned a range of merchandise which would eventually earn up to $1 billion. The film was nominated for nine Academy Awards, winning Best Sound Effects, Best Special Effects, and Best Music.

His next directorial feature was the Raiders of the Lost Ark prequel, Indiana Jones and the Temple of Doom (1984). Working once again with George Lucas and Harrison Ford, the film was shot in the United States, Sri Lanka and China. This film and Gremlins led to the creation of the PG-13 rating because some of the material was not suitable for children under 13. Temple of Doom was rated PG-13 by the MPAA; some scenes depicted children working in the mines. Spielberg later said that he was unhappy with the Temple of Doom because it did not have his "personal touches and love". Nonetheless, the film was a blockbuster hit, and won an Academy Award for Best Special Effects. It was on this project that Spielberg also met his future wife, actress Kate Capshaw, who played Willie Scott in the film.

In 1984, Spielberg, Frank Marshall, and Kathleen Kennedy founded production company Amblin Entertainment. Between 1984 and 1990, Spielberg served as either producer or executive producer on nineteen feature films; these include: The Goonies, The Money Pit, Joe Versus the Volcano, *batteries not included, Back to the Future, Cape Fear, and Who Framed Roger Rabbit. In some films, such as Harry and the Hendersons and Young Sherlock Holmes, the title "Steven Spielberg Presents" would be shown in the opening credits. Much of Spielberg's producing work was aimed at children and teens, including cartoons such as Tiny Toon Adventures, Animaniacs, Pinky and the Brain, Freakazoid!, and Family Dog. Spielberg also produced the Don Bluth animations, An American Tail and The Land Before Time.

Beginning in 1985, NBC offered Spielberg a two-year contract on a television series, Amazing Stories; the show was marketed as a blend of The Twilight Zone and Alfred Hitchcock Presents. NBC gave Spielberg creative control and a budget of $1 million for each episode. After two seasons and disappointing ratings, the show was not renewed. Although Spielberg's involvement as a producer would vary widely from project to project, director Robert Zemeckis said that Spielberg would always "respect the filmmaker's vision". Over the next decade, Spielberg's record as a producer brought mixed critical and commercial performance. In 1992, Spielberg began to scale back producing, saying "Producing has been the least fulfilling aspect of what I've done in the last decade." In 1994, he found success producing the successful medical drama ER.

In the early 1980s, Spielberg befriended WarnerMedia CEO Steve Ross, which eventually resulted in him making films for Warner Bros. This started with The Color Purple (1985), an adaptation of Alice Walker's Pulitzer Prize-winning novel of the same name, about a generation of empowered African-American women during depression-era America. It was Spielberg's first film on a serious subject matter, and he expressed reservations about tackling the project: "It's the risk of being judged-and accused of not having the sensibility to do character studies." Starring Whoopi Goldberg and Oprah Winfrey, the film was a box office hit and critics started to take note of Spielberg's foray into the dramatic genre. Roger Ebert rated it as the best film of the year. The film also received eleven Academy Award nominations, and Spielberg won Best Director from the Directors Guild of America.

As China underwent economic reform and opened up to the American film industry, Spielberg shot the first American film in Shanghai since the 1930s. Empire of the Sun (1987), an adaptation of J. G. Ballard's autobiographical novel of the same name, starred John Malkovich and a young Christian Bale. The film tells the story of Jamie Graham (Bale), a young boy who goes from living in a wealthy British family in Shanghai, to becoming a prisoner of war in a Japanese internment camp during World War II. Critical consensus was mixed at the time of release; criticism ranged from the "overwrought" plot, to Spielberg's downplaying of "disease and starvation". However, critic Andrew Sarris called it the best film of the year and later included it among the best of the decade. The film was nominated for six Academy Awards, but a commercial disappointment at the box office. Ian Alterman of The New York Times thought it was overlooked by audiences; Spielberg recalled that Empire of the Sun was one of his most enjoyable films to make.

After directing the last two serious films, Spielberg intended to direct the comedy Rain Man, but instead directed the third Indiana Jones film to meet his contractual obligations: Indiana Jones and the Last Crusade (1989). Producer George Lucas, and Harrison Ford returned for the film. Spielberg cast Sean Connery in a supporting role as Henry Jones, Sr. As a result of the mixed reaction to 1984's Temple of Doom, Spielberg toned down the darkness and violence in the third installment. Last Crusade gained mostly respectful reviews and was a box office success, earning $474 million; it was his biggest hit since 1982's E.T. Biographer Joseph McBride wrote that it was a comeback for Spielberg, and Spielberg acknowledged the amount he has learned from making the Indiana Jones series.

Also in 1989, he reunited with Richard Dreyfuss in the romantic drama Always, about a daredevil pilot who extinguishes forest fires. It is a modern remake of one of Spielberg's childhood favorite films, 1943's A Guy Named Joe. The story was personal to him, and he said "As a child I was very frustrated, and maybe I saw my own parents [in A Guy Named Joe]. I was also short of girlfriends. And it stuck with me." Spielberg had discussed the film with Dreyfuss back in 1975, with up to twelve drafts being written before filming commenced. Always was commercially unsuccessful and received mixed reviews. Janet Maslin of The New York Times wrote, "Always is filled with big, sentimental moments, it lacks the intimacy to make any of this very moving."

1991–1998: Critical and commercial success with accolades 

After a brief setback in which Spielberg felt "artistically stalled", he returned in 1991 with Hook, about a middle-aged Peter Pan, played by Robin Williams, who returns to Neverland. During filming, Williams, co-stars Dustin Hoffman and Julia Roberts clashed on set due to their personalities; Spielberg told the 60 Minutes program that he would never work with Roberts again. Nominated for five Academy Awards, the studio enjoyed the film but most critics did not, calling it "bloated". Writing for The Washington Post, Desson Howe described the film as "too industrially organized", and thought it was mundane. At the box office, it earned over $300 million worldwide from a $70 million budget. In 1993, Spielberg served as an executive producer for the NBC science fiction series seaQuest DSV; the show was not a hit.

In 1993, Spielberg returned to the adventure genre with Jurassic Park, based on the 1990 novel of the same name by Michael Crichton, and a screenplay by the latter and David Koepp. Jurassic Park is set on a fictional island near Costa Rica, where a team of genetic scientists have created a wildlife park of de-extinct dinosaurs. In a departure from his usual order of planning, Spielberg and the designers storyboarded certain sequences from the novel early on. The film also used computer-generated imagery provided by Industrial Light & Magic; Jurassic Park was completed on time and became the highest-grossing film at the time, and won three Academy Awards. The film's dominance during its theatrical run, as well as Spielberg's $250 million salary, made him self-conscious of his own success.

Also in 1993, Spielberg directed Schindler's List, about Oskar Schindler, a businessman who helped save 1,100 Jews from the Holocaust. Based on Schindler's Ark by Australian novelist Thomas Keneally, Spielberg waited ten years to make the film as he did not feel "mature" enough. He wanted to embrace his heritage, and after the birth of his son, Max, he said that "it greatly affected me [...] A spirit began to ignite in me, and I became a Jewish dad". Filming commenced on March 1, 1993, in Poland, while Spielberg was still editing Jurassic Park in the evenings. To make filming "bearable", Spielberg brought his wife and children with him. While Schindler's List was praised by most critics, some reviewers, including filmmaker Claude Lanzmann, criticized the film for its weak representation of the Holocaust. Imre Kertész, a Hungarian author and concentration camp survivor, also disliked the film, saying "I regard as kitsch any representation of the Holocaust that is incapable of understanding or unwilling to understand the organic connection between our own deformed mode of life and the very possibility of the Holocaust." Against expectations, the film was a commercial success, and Spielberg used his percentage of profits to start the Shoah Foundation, a non-profit organization that archives testimonies of Holocaust survivors. Schindler's List won seven Academy Awards, including Best Picture, and Spielberg's first as Best Director. It also won seven BAFTAs, and three Golden Globes. According to the American Film Institute, Schindler's List is one of the 100 best American films ever made.In 1994, Spielberg took a break from directing to spend more time with his family, and setup his new film studio, DreamWorks, with Jeffrey Katzenberg and David Geffen. Spielberg cited more creative control and distribution improvements as the main reasons for founding his own studio; he and his partners compared themselves to the founders of United Artists back in 1919. DreamWorks' investors included Microsoft founders Paul Allen and Bill Gates. After founding DreamWorks, Spielberg continued to operate Amblin Entertainment and direct films for other studios. Besides film, Spielberg helped design a Jurassic Park-themed attraction at Universal Orlando in Florida. The workload of filmmaking and operating a studio raised questions about his commitments, but Spielberg maintained that "this is all fitting nicely into my life and I'm still home by six and I'm still home on the weekends."

After his hiatus, he returned to directing with a sequel to Jurassic Park: The Lost World: Jurassic Park (1997). A loose adaptation of Michael Crichton's novel, The Lost World, the plot follows mathematician Ian Malcolm (Jeff Goldblum) and his researchers who study dinosaurs at a Jurassic Park island, and are confronted by another team with a different agenda. This time, Spielberg wanted the onscreen creatures to be more realistic than in the first film; he used 3D storyboards, computer imagery and robotic puppets. Budgeted at $73 million, The Lost World: Jurassic Park opened in May 1997 and was one of the highest grossing films of the year. The Village Voice critic opined that The Lost World was "better crafted but less fun" that the first film, while The Guardian wrote "It looks like a director on autopilot [...] The special effects brook no argument."

His 1997 feature, Amistad, his first released under DreamWorks, was based on the true story of the events in 1839 aboard the slave ship La Amistad. Producer Debbie Allen, who had read the book Amistad I in 1978, thought Spielberg would be perfect to direct. Spielberg was hesitant taking on the project, afraid that it would be compared to Schindler's List, but he said, "I've never planned my career [...] In the end I do what I think I gotta do." Starring Morgan Freeman, Anthony Hopkins, Djimon Hounsou and Matthew McConaughey, Spielberg used Allen's ten years worth of research to reenact the difficult historical scenes. The film struggled to find an audience, and underperformed at the box office; Spielberg admitted that "[Amistad] became too much of a history lesson."

Spielberg's 1998 release was World War II epic Saving Private Ryan, about a group of U.S. soldiers led by Captain Miller (Tom Hanks) sent to bring home a paratrooper whose three older brothers were killed in the same twenty-four hours of the Normandy landing. Filming took place in England, and U.S. Marine Dale Dye was hired to train the actors and keep them in character during the combat scenes. Halfway through filming, Spielberg reminded the cast that they were making a tribute to thank "your grandparents and my dad, who fought in [the war]". Upon release, critics praised the direction and its realistic portrayal of war. The film grossed a successful $481 million worldwide, and Spielberg won a second Academy Award for Best Director. In August 1999, Spielberg and Hanks were awarded the Distinguished Public Service Medal from Secretary of Defense William S. Cohen.

1999–2012: Exploring different genres with acclaim 
In 2001, Spielberg and Tom Hanks produced Band of Brothers, a miniseries based on Stephen Ambrose's book of the same name. The ten-part HBO series follows Easy Company of the 101st Airborne Division's 506th Parachute Infantry Regiment. The series won a Golden Globe for Best Miniseries. Also in that year, Spielberg returned to film with A.I. Artificial Intelligence, a loose adaptation of the 1969 short story "Supertoys Last All Summer Long" by Brian Aldiss. Filmmaker Stanley Kubrick had first asked Spielberg to direct the feature in 1979. Spielberg tried to make it in the style that Kubrick would have done, though with mixed results according to some reviewers. The plot revolves around an android called David (Haley Joel Osment) who wants to be a real child. Critics thought Spielberg directed with "sentimentality", and Roger Ebert wrote, "Here is one of the most ambitious films of recent years [...] but it miscalculates in asking us to invest our emotions in a character, a machine." The film won five Saturn Awards, and grossed $236 million worldwide.

Spielberg and Tom Cruise collaborated for the futuristic neo-noir Minority Report (2002), based on the short story by Philip K. Dick, about a group of investigators who try to prevent crimes before they are committed. The film received critical acclaim. Roger Ebert named Minority Report as the best film of 2002, and praised its vision of the future. However, critic Todd McCarthy thought there was not enough action. The film earned over $358 million worldwide. Spielberg's next 2002 feature, Catch Me If You Can, is about the adventures of a young con artist (played by Leonardo DiCaprio). Christopher Walken and Tom Hanks also star. It is set in the 1960s; Spielberg said, "I have always loved movies about sensational rogues—they break the law, but you just have to love them for the moxie." At the 75th Academy Awards, Walken and John Williams were nominated for Best Supporting Actor and Best Original Score, respectively. The film was a critical and commercial success.

Spielberg worked with Tom Hanks again, along with Catherine Zeta-Jones and Stanley Tucci in 2004's The Terminal, a lighthearted comedy about an Eastern European man stranded in an airport. The Terminal was praised for its production design, and a success at the theaters, although reviews were mixed. In 2005, Spielberg directed a modern adaptation of War of the Worlds, a co-production of Paramount and DreamWorks, based on H. G. Wells' book of the same name; Spielberg had been a fan of the book and the 1953 film. Starring Tom Cruise and Dakota Fanning, the film follows an American dock worker who is forced to look after his children, from whom he lives separately, as he tries to protect and reunite them with their mother when extraterrestrials invade Earth. Spielberg used storyboards to help the actors react to computer imagery that they could not see, and used natural lighting and camerawork to avoid an "over stylized" science fiction picture. Upon release, the film was a box office hit, grossing over $600 million worldwide.

Spielberg's Munich (2005), is about eleven Israeli athletes who were kidnapped and murdered in the 1972 Munich massacre. The film is based on Vengeance, a book by Canadian journalist George Jonas. It was previously adapted for the screen in the 1986 television film Sword of Gideon. Spielberg, who personally remembers the incident, sought advice from former President Bill Clinton, among others, before making the film because he did not want to cause further problems in the Middle East. Although the film garnered mostly positive reviews, some critics perceived it as anti-Semitic; it is one of Spielberg's most controversial films to date. Munich received five Academy Awards nominations: Best Picture, Best Film Editing, Best Score, Best Adapted Screenplay, and Best Director for Spielberg. It was his sixth Best Director nomination, and fifth Best Picture nomination.

In the mid-2000s, Spielberg scaled down his directing career and became more selective about film projects to undertake. In December 2005, Spielberg and his partners sold DreamWorks to media conglomerate Viacom (now known as Paramount Global). The sale was finalized in February 2006. In June 2006, Spielberg planned to make Interstellar, but abandoned the project, which was eventually directed by Christopher Nolan. During this period, Spielberg remained active as a producer; he produced 2005's Memoirs of a Geisha, an adaptation of the novel by Arthur Golden. Spielberg and Robert Zemeckis executive-produced the animated film Monster House (2006), marking their eighth collaboration. He also worked with Clint Eastwood for the first time, co-producing 2006's Flags of Our Fathers, and Letters from Iwo Jima, with Robert Lorenz. Spielberg served as executive producer for 2007's Disturbia, and the Transformers film series. In that same year, Spielberg and Mark Burnett co-produced On the Lot, a reality and competition show about filmmaking.

Spielberg returned to the Indiana Jones series in 2008 with the fourth installment, titled Indiana Jones and the Kingdom of the Crystal Skull. Released nineteen years after Last Crusade, the film is set in 1957, pitting Indiana Jones (Harrison Ford) against Soviet agents led by Irina Spalko (Cate Blanchett), searching for a telepathic crystal skull. Principal photography was complete in October 2007, and the film was released on May 22, 2008. This was his first film not released by DreamWorks since 1997. The film received generally favorable reviews from critics, but some fans were disappointed by the introduction of alien life which was uncharacteristic of the previous films. Writing for The Age, Tom Ryan praised Spielberg and George Lucas for their realistic 1950s setting—"The energy on display is impressive". It was a box office success, grossing $790 million worldwide.
In early 2009, Spielberg shot the first film in a planned trilogy of motion capture films based on The Adventures of Tintin, written by Belgian artist Hergé.The Adventures of Tintin: The Secret of the Unicorn, was co-produced by Peter Jackson, and released in 2011; it was entirely computer animated. It premiered on October 22 in Brussels, Belgium. The film was released in North American theaters on December 21, in Digital 3D and IMAX. It received generally positive reviews from critics, and grossed over $373 million worldwide. The Adventures of Tintin won Best Animated Feature at the 69th Golden Globe Awards. It was the first non-Pixar film to win the award since the category was introduced.

Spielberg followed up with War Horse, shot in England in the summer of 2010. It was released four days after The Adventures of Tintin, on December 25, 2011. The film is based on the novel of the same name by Michael Morpurgo, published in 1982, and follows the long friendship between a British boy and his horse Joey before and during World War I. Distributed by Walt Disney Studios, with whom DreamWorks made a distribution deal in 2009, War Horse was the first of four consecutive Spielberg films released by Disney. War Horse had an acclaimed response from critics, and was nominated for six Academy Awards, including Best Picture. In his review for Salon magazine, Andrew O'Hehir wrote, "at this point in his career Spielberg is pursuing personal goals, and everything that's terrific and overly flat and tooth-rottingly sweet about War Horse reflects that."

Spielberg returned to the World War II theme, co-producing the 2010 miniseries The Pacific, with Tom Hanks and Gary Goetzman. The miniseries is centered on the battles in the Pacific Theater. The following year, Spielberg co-created Falling Skies, a science fiction series on the TNT network, with Robert Rodat. Spielberg also produced the 2011 Fox series Terra Nova. Terra Nova begins in the year 2149 when all life on the planet Earth is threatened with extinction resulting in scientists opening a door that allows people to travel back 85 million years to prehistoric times. In that same year, he produced J. J. Abrams' thriller, Super 8.

Spielberg directed the historical drama Lincoln (2012), starring Daniel Day-Lewis as President Abraham Lincoln, and Sally Field as Mary Todd Lincoln. Based on Doris Kearns Goodwin's book Team of Rivals: The Political Genius of Abraham Lincoln, the film describes the final four months of Lincoln's life. Written by Tony Kushner, the film was shot in Richmond, Virginia, in late 2011, and was released in the U.S. in November 2012. Lincoln was acclaimed, it earned more than $250 million worldwide, and was nominated for twelve Academy Awards, including Best Picture and Best Director. It won Best Production Design, and Day-Lewis won Best Actor for his portrayal of Lincoln. Donald Clarke from The Irish Times complimented the direction: "Against the odds, Spielberg makes something genuinely exciting of the backstage wheedling."

2013–present: Recent works 
It was announced on May 2, 2013, that Spielberg would direct American Sniper, but he left the project before production began. Instead, he directed 2015's Bridge of Spies, a Cold War thriller based on the 1960 U-2 incident, and focusing on James B. Donovan's negotiations with the Soviets for the release of pilot Gary Powers after his aircraft was shot down over Soviet territory. The screenplay was by the Coen brothers, and the film starred Tom Hanks as Donovan, as well as Mark Rylance, Amy Ryan, and Alan Alda. It was filmed in the fall of 2014 in New York City, Berlin and Wroclaw, and was released on October 16. Bridge of Spies was popular with critics, and was nominated for six Academy Awards, including Best Picture; Rylance won Best Supporting Actor, becoming the second actor to win for a performance directed by Spielberg.

In 2016, Spielberg made The BFG, an adaptation of Roald Dahl's children's book, starring newcomer Ruby Barnhill, and Mark Rylance as the titular Big Friendly Giant. DreamWorks bought the rights in 2010, and John Madden had intended to direct. The film was the last to be written by E.T. screenwriter Melissa Mathison before her death. It was co-produced and released by Walt Disney Pictures, marking the first Disney-branded film to be directed by Spielberg. The BFG premiered as an out-of-competition entry at the 2016 Cannes Film Festival, and received a wide release in the U.S. on July 1, 2016. The BFG welcomed fair reviews; Michael Phillips of Chicago Tribune compared certain scenes to the works of Alfred Hitchcock and Stanley Kubrick, while Toronto Suns Liz Braun thought that there were "moments of wonder and delight" but it was too long.

A year later, Spielberg directed The Post, an account of The Washington Post'''s printing of the Pentagon Papers. Starring Tom Hanks and Meryl Streep, production began in New York on May 30, 2017. Spielberg stated his attraction to the project: "When I read the first draft of the script, this wasn't something that could wait three years or two years—this was a story I felt we needed to tell today." The film received a wide release on January 12, 2018. The Post gained positive reception; the critic from the Associated Press thought "Spielberg infuses every scene with tension and life and the grandeur of the ordinary that he's always been so good at conveying." In 2017, Spielberg and other filmmakers were featured in the Netflix documentary series Five Came Back, which discussed the contributions of directors Frank Capra, John Ford, John Huston, George Stevens and William Wyler, about their war-related works. Spielberg also served as an executive producer.

Spielberg directed the science fiction Ready Player One (2018), adapted from the novel of the same name by Ernest Cline. It stars Tye Sheridan, Olivia Cooke, Ben Mendelsohn, Lena Waithe, T.J. Miller, Simon Pegg, and Mark Rylance. The plot takes place in 2045 when much of humanity uses virtual reality to escape the real world. Ready Player One began production in July 2016, and was intended to be released on December 15, 2017, but was moved to March 2018 to avoid competition with Star Wars: The Last Jedi. It premiered at the 2018 South by Southwest film festival. Spielberg's direction was praised along with the action scenes and visual effects, but many critics thought the film was too long and overused 1980s nostalgia.

In 2019, Spielberg filmed West Side Story, an adaptation of the musical of the same name. It stars Ansel Elgort and Rachel Zegler in her film debut with Ariana DeBose, David Alvarez, Mike Faist and Rita Moreno in supporting roles. Written by Tony Kushner, the film stays true to the 1950s setting. West Side Story was released in December 2021 to positive reviews and received seven Academy Award nominations including Best Picture, and Best Director. Spielberg also received nominations from the Golden Globe Awards, Directors Guild of America, and Critics' Choice Movie Awards. The Economist praised the choreography, stating that it "stunningly melds beauty and violence". In March 2022, Spielberg revealed that West Side Story would be the last musical he will direct.

Spielberg's 2022 film The Fabelmans is a fictionalized account of his own childhood, which he wrote with Tony Kushner. Gabriel LaBelle plays Sammy Fabelman, a character inspired by Spielberg, while Michelle Williams plays Sammy's mother Mitzi Fabelman, Paul Dano plays Burt Fabelman, his father, Seth Rogen plays Bennie Loewy, Burt's best friend and co-worker who becomes Sammy's surrogate uncle, and Judd Hirsch as Mitzi's Uncle Boris. Filming began in Los Angeles in July 2021, and the film premiered at the 2022 Toronto International Film Festival on September 10, Spielberg's first appearance at that festival. It received widespread critical acclaim and won the festival's People's Choice Award. It received a limited theatrical release on November 11, 2022, by Universal Pictures, before expanding wide on November 23. Despite the favorable critical reception, West Side Story and The Fabelmans were box office failures, which Variety suggested could be attributed to a decline in the popularity and relevance of Spielberg in a film-going environment altered by the COVID-19 pandemic, and the public's loss of interest in prestige films. The Fabelmans received seven Academy Award nominations, including Best Picture, Best Director, and Best Original Screenplay.

 Upcoming projects 
On January 18, 2023, Spielberg told press at a red carpet event for The Fabelmans that he was executive producing a documentary about John Williams, directed by Laurent Bouzereau with production companies Amblin Television, Imagine Documentaries, and Nedland Media. Other executive producers for the film include Brian Grazer, Ron Howard, Darryl Frank, Justin Falvey, Justin Wilkes, Sara Bernstein, and Meredith Kaulfers. The announcement came days after Williams told Spielberg he was not retiring.

In February 2022, Deadline Hollywood reported that Spielberg was developing an original film centered around the character Frank Bullitt, a fictional San Francisco police officer originally portrayed by Steve McQueen in the 1968 film Bullitt. The screenplay is set to be written by Josh Singer, who previously co-wrote The Post for Spielberg. McQueen's son Chad and granddaughter Molly will serve as executive producers. Bradley Cooper was cast as Bullitt in November 2022 and will also serve as producer alongside Spielberg and Kristie Macosko Krieger.

Spielberg had planned to direct the fifth installment of the Indiana Jones series, but he was replaced by James Mangold. Spielberg said that he will remain "hands on" as a producer, along with Kathleen Kennedy and Frank Marshall. In 2016, it was announced that it would be written by David Koepp, with a release by Disney on July 19, 2019. After a change of filming and release dates, it was postponed again when Jonathan Kasdan was announced as the film's new writer. Soon after, a new release date of July 9, 2021, was announced. In May 2019, Dan Fogelman was hired to write a new script, and Kasdan's story, focused on the Nazi gold train, would not be used. In April 2020, it was announced that the release of the film was delayed to July 29, 2022, due to the COVID-19 pandemic, and in October 2021, the release date was again delayed to June 30, 2023. The film began production in the UK in June 2021 and finished in February 2022.

In January 2013, HBO confirmed that it was developing a third World War II miniseries based on the book Masters of the Air by Donald L. Miller with Spielberg and Tom Hanks. NME reported in March 2017 that production was under the working title The Mighty Eighth. By 2019, it was confirmed development of the series, Masters of the Air, had moved to Apple TV+. On June 21, 2021, it was announced that Amblin Entertainment signed a deal with Netflix to release multiple new feature films for the streaming service. Under the deal, Amblin is expected to produce at least two films a year for Netflix for an unspecified number of years. It is possible that Spielberg may even direct some projects.

Prospective projects
In May 2009, Spielberg bought the rights to the life story of Martin Luther King Jr., with the intention of being involved as both the producer and director. However, the purchase was made from the King estate, led by son Dexter, while the two other surviving children, the Reverend Bernice and Martin III, immediately threatened to sue, not having given their approvals to the project.

In 2015, it was announced that Spielberg was attached to direct an adaptation of American photojournalist Lynsey Addario's memoir It's What I Do, with Jennifer Lawrence in the lead role.

In April 2018, it was announced that Spielberg would direct a film adaptation of the Blackhawk comic book series. Warner Bros. will distribute the film, with David Koepp writing the script.

In March 2013, Spielberg announced that he was developing a miniseries based on the life of Napoleon. In May 2016, it was announced that Cary Fukunaga is in talks to direct the miniseries for HBO, from a script by David Leland based on extensive research materials accumulated by Stanley Kubrick over the years.

Spielberg was set to film an adaptation of David Kertzer's The Kidnapping of Edgardo Mortara in early 2017, for release at the end of that year, but production has been postponed. It was first announced in 2014, with Tony Kushner adapting the book for the screen. Mark Rylance, in his fourth collaboration with Spielberg, was announced to star in the role of Pope Pius IX. Spielberg saw more than 2,000 children to play the role of Edgardo Mortara.

 Other ventures 
Production

In 1984, Spielberg, Frank Marshall, and Kathleen Kennedy founded production company Amblin Entertainment. Between 1984 and 1990, Spielberg served as either producer or executive producer on nineteen feature films; these include: The Goonies, The Money Pit, Joe Versus the Volcano, *batteries not included, Back to the Future, Cape Fear, and Who Framed Roger Rabbit. In some films, such as Harry and the Hendersons and Young Sherlock Holmes, the title "Steven Spielberg Presents" would be shown in the opening credits. Much of Spielberg's producing work was aimed at children and teens, including cartoons such as Tiny Toon Adventures, Animaniacs, Pinky and the Brain, Freakazoid!, and Family Dog. Spielberg also produced the Don Bluth animations, An American Tail and The Land Before Time.In 1994, Spielberg setup his new film studio, DreamWorks, with Jeffrey Katzenberg and David Geffen. Spielberg cited more creative control and distribution improvements as the main reasons for founding his own studio; he and his partners compared themselves to the founders of United Artists back in 1919. DreamWorks' investors included Microsoft founders Paul Allen and Bill Gates. After founding DreamWorks, Spielberg continued to operate Amblin Entertainment and direct films for other studios.
 Games 
Spielberg has been an avid gamer since 1974; in 2005, Spielberg collaborated with Electronic Arts (EA) on several games including one for the Wii called Boom Blox, and its sequel Boom Blox Bash Party. He is also the creator of EA's Medal of Honor series. In 1996, Spielberg helped create and design of LucasArts' adventure game The Dig. He also collaborated with software publishers Knowledge Adventure on the game Steven Spielberg's Director's Chair, which was released in 1996; Spielberg appears in the game to direct the player.

Spielberg played many of LucasArts adventure games, including the first Monkey Island games. He owns a Wii, a PlayStation 3, a PSP, and an Xbox 360, and enjoys playing first-person shooters such as the Medal of Honor series and Call of Duty 4: Modern Warfare. He dislikes the use of cutscenes in games, and thinks that natural storytelling is a challenge for game developers.

 Filmmaking style 

 Influences 
Spielberg has cited Frank Capra's It's A Wonderful Life (1946) as an influence on "family, community and suburbia". He enjoyed the work of Alfred Hitchcock, David Lean, John Ford, Stanley Kubrick and John Frankenheimer. In college, he was inspired by foreign films directed by Ingmar Bergman, Jacques Tati and François Truffaut. Truffaut was one of his favorite directors. Spencer Tracy has also influenced the characters of Spielberg's films, as did The Twilight Zone series.

 Method and themes 

Spielberg often uses storyboards to visualize the sequences, with the exceptions being in E.T. and The Color Purple. After the experience of filming Jaws, Spielberg learned to leave special effect scenes until last, and exclude the media from filming locations. Spielberg prefers to shoot quickly, with large amounts of coverage (from single-shot to multi-shot setups), so that he will have many options in the editing room. From the beginning of his career, Spielberg's shooting style consisted of extreme high and low camera angles, long takes, and handheld cameras. He favors wide-angle lens for creating depth, and by the time he was making Minority Report, he was more confident with elaborate camera movements.

In an interview with The Tech in 2015, Spielberg described how he chooses the film projects he would work on:[Sometimes], a story speaks to me, even if it doesn't speak to any of my collaborators or any of my partners, who look at me and scratch their heads and say, "Gee, are you sure you wanna get into that trench for a year and a half?" I love people challenging me that way because it's a real test about my own convictions and [whether] I can be the standing man of my own life and take a stand on a subject that may not be popular, but that I would be proud to add to the body of my work. That's pretty much the litmus test that gets me to say, "Yeah, I'll direct that one."Spielberg's films contain many similar themes throughout his work. One of his most pertinent themes revolves around "ordinary people in extraordinary circumstances." The ordinary people often have limitations, but they succeed in becoming a "hero". A consistent theme in his family-friendly work is a childlike sense of wonder and faith, and "the goodness in humanity will prevail." He has also explored the importance of childhood, loss of innocence, and the need for parental figures. In exploring the parent-child relationship, there is usually a flawed or irresponsible father figure. This theme personally resonates with Spielberg's childhood. Exploring extraterrestrial life is another aspect to his work. Spielberg described himself as like an "alien" during childhood, and this interest came from his father, a science fiction fan.

 Collaborators 
Michael Kahn has edited all but one of Spielberg's films since the 1970s. Spielberg has also worked consistently with production designer Rick Carter, and writer David Koepp. The producer Kathleen Kennedy is one of Spielberg's longest serving collaborators. Spielberg also displays loyalty to his actors, casting them repeatedly including: Tom Hanks, Harrison Ford, Mark Rylance, Richard Dreyfuss, and Tom Cruise.

Hanks has collaborated with Spielberg in various projects in both film and television. He first worked with Spielberg in 1998's Saving Private Ryan, for which he received a nomination for Academy Award for Best Actor. Hanks starred in four more films, Catch Me if You Can (2002), The Terminal (2004), Bridge of Spies (2015), and The Post (2017). The pair also executive produced the war miniseries Band of Brothers (2001) and The Pacific (2010), both of which gained them Primetime Emmy Awards.

Janusz Kamiński has served as a cinematographer on dozens of Spielberg's films. Kamiński's first collaboration with Spielberg started with the holocaust drama film Schindler's List (1993) for which Kamiński received the Academy Award for Best Cinematography. The film used black and white cinematography. As Spielberg's career evolved from action to drama films, he and Kamiński adopted more handheld camerawork, as evidenced in Schindler's List and Amistad. Kamiński would later receive his second Academy Award for cinematography on Saving Private Ryan. The film's opening sequence to re-enact the invasion of Normandy was praised for realism. Kamiński garnered three more Academy Award nominations for his work on War Horse (2011), the historical epic Lincoln (2015), and West Side Story (2021).

Spielberg's long-time partnership with composer John Williams began with The Sugarland Express (1974) Williams would return to compose all but five of Spielberg's feature films (the exceptions are Twilight Zone: The Movie, The Color Purple, Bridge of Spies, Ready Player One and West Side Story). Williams won three of his five Academy Awards for Best Original Score for his work on Spielberg's films, which were Jaws (1975), E.T. the Extra-Terrestrial (1982), and Schindler's List (1993). While making Schindler's List, Spielberg approached Williams about composing the score. After seeing a rough, unedited cut, Williams was impressed, and said that composing would be too challenging. He said to Spielberg, "You need a better composer than I am for this film." Spielberg responded, "I know. But they're all dead!" In 2016, Spielberg presented Williams with the 44th AFI Life Achievement Award, the first to be awarded to a composer. Williams scored Spielberg's latest film The Fabelmans (2022), his 29th film collaboration with Spielberg.

 Personal life 
Spielberg met actress Amy Irving in 1976 when she auditioned for Close Encounters of the Third Kind. After meeting her, Spielberg told his co-producer Julia Phillips, "I met a real heartbreaker last night." Although she was too young for the role, she and Spielberg began dating and she eventually moved into what she described as his "bachelor funky" house. They broke up in 1979. In 1984, they renewed their romance and married in November 1985. Their son, Max, had been born on June 13 of that year. In 1989, the couple divorced; they agreed to live near each other to share custody of their son. Their divorce settlement is one of the most expensive in history.

Spielberg met actress Kate Capshaw when he cast her in Indiana Jones and the Temple of Doom. They married on October 12, 1991; Capshaw converted to Judaism before their marriage. Spielberg said he rediscovered "the honor of being a Jew" when they married. He said, "Kate is Protestant and she insisted on converting to Judaism. She spent a year studying, did the "mikveh," the whole thing. She chose to do a full conversion before we were married in 1991, and she married me after becoming a Jew. I think that, more than anything else, brought me back to Judaism." He credits her for the family's level of observance; "This shiksa goddess has made me a better Jew than my own parents", he said. He and his family live in Pacific Palisades, California, and East Hampton, New York.

He has five children with Capshaw: Sasha Rebecca Spielberg (born May 14, 1990), Sawyer Avery Spielberg (born March 10, 1992), and Destry Allyn Spielberg (born December 1, 1996), and two adopted children: Theo Spielberg (born August 21, 1988), and Mikaela George (born February 28, 1996). He also has a stepdaughter, Jessica Capshaw (born August 9, 1976). 

In 1997, a man named Jonathan Norman stalked and attempted to enter Spielberg's home; Norman was jailed for 25 years. In 2001, Spielberg was stalked by conspiracy theorist and former social worker Diana Napolis. She accused him, and actress Jennifer Love Hewitt, of installing a mind-control device in her brain, and being part of a satanic cult. Napolis was committed to a mental institution, and pled guilty to stalking. She was released on probation with a condition that she have no contact with either Spielberg or Hewitt.

Spielberg was diagnosed with dyslexia at age 60.

In 2013, Spielberg purchased the  mega-yacht The Seven Seas for US$182 million. He has put it up for sale and has made it available for charter. At US$1.2 million per month, it is one of the most expensive charters on the market. He has ordered a new  yacht at a reported US$250 million.

In 2022, Spielberg was diagnosed with COVID-19 at age 75.

In December 2022, Spielberg was a guest on Desert Island Discs for BBC Radio 4, choosing for his luxury item an H-8 Bolex Camera.

 Political views 
Spielberg has usually supported U.S. Democratic Party candidates. He has donated over $800,000 to the Democratic party and its nominees. He has been a close friend of former president Bill Clinton and worked with the president for the USA Millennium celebrations. He directed an 18-minute film for the project, scored by John Williams and entitled The American Journey. It was shown at America's Millennium Gala on December 31, 1999, in the National Mall at the Reflecting Pool at the base of the Lincoln Memorial in Washington, D.C. Spielberg endorsed Hillary Clinton in the 2016 presidential election; he donated $1 million to Priorities USA Action.

 Spielberg resigned as a member of the national advisory board of the Boy Scouts of America in 2001 because he disagreed with the organization's anti-homosexuality stance. In 2007, the Arab League voted to boycott Spielberg's movies after he donated $1 million for relief efforts in Israel during the 2006 Lebanon War. On February 20, 2007, Spielberg, Jeffrey Katzenberg, and David Geffen invited Democrats to a fundraiser for Barack Obama.

In February 2008, Spielberg resigned as advisor to the 2008 Summer Olympics in response to the Chinese government's inaction over the War in Darfur. Spielberg said in a statement, "I find that my conscience will not allow me to continue business as usual [...] Sudan's government bears the bulk of the responsibility for these on-going crimes, but the international community, and particularly China, should be doing more." The International Olympic Committee (IOC) respected Spielberg's decision but IOC president Jacques Rogge expressed disappointment: "[Spielberg] certainly would have brought a lot to the opening ceremony in terms of creativity." Chinese state media called Spielberg's comments "unfair".

In September 2008, Spielberg and his wife offered their support to same-sex marriage in California by issuing a statement following their donation of $100,000 to the "No on Proposition 8" campaign fund, a figure equal to the amount of money Brad Pitt donated to the same campaign less than a week prior. In 2018, Spielberg and his wife donated $500,000 to the March for Our Lives student demonstration in favor of gun control in the United States.

 Filmography 

Prolific in film since the 1960s, Spielberg has directed 34 feature films, and co-produced many works.

 Awards and recognition 

 

Spielberg has won three Academy Awards. He received nine nominations for Best Director, and won twice (for Schindler's List and Saving Private Ryan). His third was in Best Picture, for Schindler's List. In 1987, he was awarded the Irving G. Thalberg Memorial Award for his work as a creative producer. Drawing from his own experiences in Scouting, Spielberg helped the Boy Scouts of America develop a merit badge in cinematography to promote filmmaking as a marketable skill; the badge was launched at the 1989 National Scout Jamboree. In 1989, Spielberg was presented with the Distinguished Eagle Scout Award. Spielberg received the AFI Life Achievement Award in 1995.

In 1998, he was awarded the Order of Merit of the Federal Republic of Germany. The award was presented to him by President Roman Herzog in recognition of Schindler's List and work with the Shoah Foundation. Spielberg was awarded the Medal for Distinguished Public Service in 1999, in recognition for Saving Private Ryan. For the same film, he also received an award for Outstanding Directorial Achievement in Motion Pictures by the Directors Guild of America. The next year, he received the Lifetime Achievement Award from the Directors Guild of America.

Spielberg was given a star on the Hollywood Walk of Fame in 2003, located on 6801 Hollywood Boulevard. Additionally, he was awarded the Blessed are the Peacemakers Award from the Catholic Theological Union in 2003. On July 15, 2006, Spielberg was awarded the Gold Hugo Lifetime Achievement Award at the Summer Gala of the Chicago International Film Festival, and was awarded a Kennedy Center honor on December 3. The tribute to Spielberg featured a biographical short film narrated by Liam Neeson, and a performance of the finale to Leonard Bernstein's Candide, conducted by John Williams.

The Science Fiction Hall of Fame inducted Spielberg in 2005, the first year it considered non-literary contributors. He was a recipient of the Visual Effects Society Lifetime Achievement Award in February 2008; it is awarded for "significant and lasting contributions to the art and science of the visual effects industry." In 2009, Spielberg was awarded the Cecil B. DeMille Award by the Hollywood Foreign Press Association for "outstanding contributions to the world of entertainment".

In 2001, he was appointed as an honorary Knight Commander of the Order of the British Empire (KBE) by Queen Elizabeth II for services to the British film industry. In 2004, he was awarded France's highest civil honor, the Légion d'Honneur by President Jacques Chirac. In June 2008, Spielberg received Arizona State University's Hugh Downs Award for Communication Excellence. In October 2009, Spielberg received the Philadelphia Liberty Medal; the prize was presented by former U.S. President Bill Clinton. In October 2011, he was made a Commander of the Order of the Belgian Crown, one of Belgium's highest honors.

On November 19, 2013, Spielberg was honored by the National Archives and Records Administration with a Records of Achievement Award. Spielberg was given two facsimiles of the 13th Amendment; the first which passed in 1861 but was not ratified, and the second signed by Abraham Lincoln in 1865 to abolish slavery. The amendment and the process of passing it were the subject of his film Lincoln. On November 24, 2015, Spielberg was awarded the Presidential Medal of Freedom from President Barack Obama at the White House.

In July 2016, Spielberg was awarded a gold Blue Peter badge by the BBC children's television programme Blue Peter. Spielberg has honorary degrees from the University of Southern California, 1994; Brown University, 1999; Yale University, 2002; Boston University, 2009; and Harvard University, 2016.

 Legacy 
thumb|right|Spielberg's star on the Hollywood Walk of Fame|169x169pxA figure of the New Hollywood era, Spielberg is one of the greatest and most influential film directors in filmmaking history and the most commercially successful film directors ever. In 1996, Life magazine named Spielberg the most influential person of his generation. In 2003, Premiere magazine ranked him first place in the list of 100 Most Powerful People in Movies. In 2005, Empire magazine ranked him number one on a list of the greatest film directors of all time. In 2013, Time magazine listed him as one of the 100 most influential people. According to Forbes magazine of Most Influential Celebrities of 2014, Spielberg was ranked at first place. As of December 2022, Forbes estimates his net worth at $4billion.

His work is admired by many other directors, including Robert Aldrich, Ingmar Bergman, Werner Herzog, Stanley Kubrick, David Lean, Sidney Lumet, Roman Polanski, Martin Scorsese, François Truffaut, Jean Renoir and David Lynch. Spielberg's films have also influenced directors J. J. Abrams, Paul Thomas Anderson, Neill Blomkamp, Roland Emmerich, Peter Jackson, Kal Ng, Robert Rodriguez, John Sayles, Ridley Scott, John Singleton, Kevin Smith, Don Hertzfeldt and Gareth Edwards.

In 2004, film critic Tom Shone said of Spielberg, "If you have to point to any one director of the last twenty-five years [1979–2004] in whose work the medium of film was most fully itself – where we found out what it does best when left to its own devices, it has to be that guy." Jess Cagle, former editor of Entertainment Weekly, called Spielberg "... arguably (well, who would argue?) the greatest filmmaker in history." Stephen Rowley, writing for Senses of Cinema, discussed Spielberg's strengths as a filmmaker, saying "there is a welcome complexity of tone and approach in these later films that defies the lazy stereotypes often bandied about his films", and that "Spielberg continues to take risks, with his body of work continuing to grow more impressive and ambitious", concluding that he has only received "limited, begrudging recognition" from critics. In a 1999 "Millennium Movies" survey of British film fans run by the Sky Premier channel, Spielberg had seven films in the top 100, which made him the most popular director.

Critics of Spielberg have argued that his films are commonly sentimental and moralistic. In Easy Riders, Raging Bulls, Peter Biskind wrote that Spielberg is "infantilizing the audience, reconstituting the spectator as child, then overwhelming him and her with sound and spectacle, obliterating irony, aesthetic self-consciousness, and critical reflection." Critic Ray Carney and actor Crispin Glover opined that Spielberg's works lack depth and do not take risks. Critic Pauline Kael, who enjoyed Spielberg's films in the 1970s, expressed disappointment in his later work, stating that "he's become, I think, a very bad director.... And I'm a little ashamed for him, because I loved his early work.... [H]e turned to virtuous movies. And he's become so uninteresting now.... I think that he had it in him to become more of a fluid, far-out director. But, instead, he's become a melodramatist." Filmmaker Jean-Luc Godard opined that Spielberg was partly responsible for the lack of artistic merit in mainstream cinema, and accused Spielberg of using Schindler's List to profit from a tragedy. In defense of Spielberg, critic Roger Ebert said "Has Godard or any other director living or dead done more than Spielberg, with his Holocaust Project, to honor and preserve the memories of the survivors?"

Seven of his films have been inducted into the National Film Registry by the Library of Congress as being "culturally, historically, or aesthetically significant": Jaws, Close Encounters of the Third Kind, Raiders of the Lost Ark, E.T., Jurassic Park, Schindler's List, and Saving Private Ryan''.

See also
 Directors with two films rated "A+" by CinemaScore
 Steven Spielberg's unrealized projects

References

Bibliography

Further reading

External links 

 
 
 
 
 
 
 
 
 Joseph McBride Papers, 1960-2008 - Wisconsin Historical Society

 
1946 births
Living people
20th-century American businesspeople
20th-century American Jews
20th-century American male actors
20th-century American male writers
20th-century American screenwriters
21st-century American businesspeople
21st-century American Jews
21st-century American male actors
21st-century American male writers
21st-century American screenwriters
Action film directors
AFI Life Achievement Award recipients
Akira Kurosawa Award winners
American art collectors
American billionaires
American film editors
American film producers
American film production company founders
American film studio executives
American humanitarians
American male film actors
American male screenwriters
American mass media company founders
American people of Russian-Jewish descent
American people of Ukrainian-Jewish descent
American philanthropists
American television directors
BAFTA fellows
Best Directing Academy Award winners
Best Director BAFTA Award winners
Best Director Golden Globe winners
Businesspeople from Arizona
Businesspeople from Cincinnati
Businesspeople from Los Angeles
Businesspeople from New Jersey
Businesspeople from New York (state)
California Democrats
California State University, Long Beach alumni
Cannes Film Festival Award for Best Screenplay winners
Cecil B. DeMille Award Golden Globe winners
César Honorary Award recipients
Chevaliers of the Légion d'honneur
Commanders of the Order of the Crown (Belgium)
David di Donatello Career Award winners
David di Donatello winners
Daytime Emmy Award winners
Directors Guild of America Award winners
Writers with dyslexia
Fantasy film directors
Film directors from Arizona
Film directors from Los Angeles
Film directors from New Jersey
Film directors from New York (state)
Film directors from Ohio
Film theorists
Filmmakers who won the Best Film BAFTA Award
Golden Globe Award-winning producers
Honorary Knights Commander of the Order of the British Empire
Hugo Award winners
Inkpot Award winners
International Emmy Founders Award winners
Jewish American art collectors
Jewish American male actors
Jewish American philanthropists
Jewish American writers
Jewish film people
Jewish American film producers
Jewish American film directors
Jews and Judaism in Cincinnati
Kennedy Center honorees
Knights Commander of the Order of Merit of the Federal Republic of Germany
Male actors from Arizona
Male actors from California
Male actors from Cincinnati
Male actors from Los Angeles
Male actors from New Jersey
Male actors from New York (state)
Male actors from Phoenix, Arizona
National Humanities Medal recipients
People from East Hampton (town), New York
People from Haddon Township, New Jersey
People from Saratoga, California
Presidential Medal of Freedom recipients
Primetime Emmy Award winners
Producers who won the Best Picture Academy Award
Recipients of the Irving G. Thalberg Memorial Award
Science fiction film directors
Science Fiction Hall of Fame inductees
Screenwriters from Arizona
Screenwriters from California
Screenwriters from New Jersey
Screenwriters from New York (state)
Screenwriters from Ohio
Special effects people
Television producers from Arizona
Television producers from California
Television producers from New Jersey
Television producers from New York (state)
Television producers from Ohio
Writers from Cincinnati
Writers from Los Angeles
Writers from New Jersey
Writers from New York (state)
Writers from Phoenix, Arizona